Hoseynabad (also Romanized as Ḩoseynābād) is a village in Fatuyeh Rural District, in the Central District of Bastak County, Hormozgan Province, Iran. At the 2006 census, its population was 97, in 20 families.

References 

Populated places in Bastak County